John Stuart (1877–1969) was the chief executive officer of the Quaker Oats Company from 1922 to 1953.

Biography
John Stuart was born in Chicago in 1877, the son of Robert Stuart and his wife Margaret Shearer.  He was educated at the University of Chicago Laboratory Schools.  As a teenager, he would work in his father's mill in Cedar Rapids, Iowa sweeping floors.  After high school, he was educated at Princeton University, graduating in 1900. He won the first TransMississippi Amateur golf tournament at the Kansas City Country Club in 1901. 

In 1899, Stuart's father and his business partner Henry Parsons Crowell had used a proxy fight to gain control of the American Cereal Company from Ferdinand Schumacher.  In 1901, they renamed the company the Quaker Oats Company, to take advantage of the brand previously built up by Crowell's Quaker Mill Company.  In 1907, at age 30, Stuart was named a director of the Quaker Oats Company and soon became thoroughly acquainted with the business.

Stuart took over as CEO of the Quaker Oats Company in 1922, at age 43.  His brother R. Douglas Stuart then took over marketing responsibilities from Crowell a short time later.  During Stuart's time as CEO, the company introduced new products, such as Puffed Wheat and Puffed Rice.  The company purchased Aunt Jemima in 1925.  The company diversified in 1942 with the purchase of dog food brand Ken-L Ration, to be followed up by the acquisition of the Puss 'n Boots cat food brand in 1950.  Stuart stepped down as CEO in 1953, handing the reins to his designated successor Donold Lourie.

In addition to his work at the Quaker Oats Company, Stuart sat on the board of directors of International Harvester, the Canadian Imperial Bank of Commerce, the Pennsylvania Railroad, and Northern Trust.  He was a trustee of Princeton University and of the University of Chicago.

Also, in 1947, at the request of President of the United States Harry Truman, Stuart was a member of the Hoover Commission.

Stuart was married to the former Ellen Shumway.  Together the couple had two daughters and a son, John Stuart, Jr.

Stuart died at Lake Forest Hospital on December 26, 1969.

References
Company History from the Quaker Oats website
 "John Stuart, Quaker Oats Director, Dies", Chicago Tribune, Dec. 27, 1969

1877 births
1969 deaths
American chief executives of food industry companies
Businesspeople from Chicago
Princeton University alumni
Quaker Oats Company
University of Chicago Laboratory Schools alumni